Paul V. Nolan (November 5, 1923 – June 25, 2009) was an American physician, veteran, statesman, Hamilton County Commissioner, and one term in the Tennessee Legislature. He was married to Anne Nolan. Nolan Elementary School in Signal Mountain, Tennessee was named after him.

Early life
Nolan was born in Bladenboro, North Carolina. He graduated from Mars Hill Junior College and the two-year medical program at The University of North Carolina at Chapel Hill. He graduated from medical school at the University of Maryland. While in the military, he received a Master's in Public Health from the UC Berkeley School of Public Health.

Military service
During WWII, he served in the U.S. Navy at Camp LeJeune, N.C., and then served as a flight surgeon in the U.S. Air Force during the Korean War. After Berkeley, he served as a Preventive Medicine Officer in the Tactical Air Command at Langley Field in Virginia.

Later career
He moved to Signal Mountain in 1959 when he accepted the position of medical director for E.I. DuPont of Chattanooga.

Dr. Nolan was a member of the Hamilton County Quarterly Court from 1966 until 1978, and served as a state representative to the 86th Tennessee General Assembly from 1969 to 1970, representing the sixth district. His political party affiliation was Republican. He served four terms on the County Commission, serving the Signal Mountain/Red Bank area from 1982 until 1998.

He died of liver cancer and was interred at Chattanooga National Cemetery.

References

UC Berkeley School of Public Health alumni
University of North Carolina at Chapel Hill alumni
Mars Hill University alumni
University System of Maryland alumni
Physicians from Tennessee
Members of the Tennessee House of Representatives
2009 deaths
1923 births
People from Bladen County, North Carolina
People from Signal Mountain, Tennessee
20th-century American politicians
United States Navy personnel of World War II